Mariam Konaté (born August 21, 2000) is a Ivorian basketball player. She plays for Ivory Coast women's national basketball team.

High school
Konaté went to Stephen Leacock Collegiate Institute.

College
She was a student of George Brown College, majoring in General Arts and Science. She was part of the women basketball team; George Brown Huskies, where she averaged 13.0 points per game, 4.6 rebounds and 1.3 assists.

National Team Career
Konaté participated in the 2021 Fiba's women's Afrobasket with her national team and averaged 4.3 points per game,1.3 rebounds per game and 1.3 assists.

References

Guinean sportswomen
Guinean basketball players
Ivorian women's basketball players
Living people
2000 births